Forte de Nossa Senhora dos Remédios is a fort located on the island of Fernando de Noronha (in the archipelago and municipality of the same name) in the state of Pernambuco in Brazil.

See also
Military history of Brazil

References

External links

Nossa Senhora
Buildings and structures in Pernambuco
Portuguese colonial architecture in Brazil